Scouting 'Round the World is the seminal work on world Scouting, a publication of the World Organization of the Scout Movement, updated every three years, with details on all WOSM member-nation organizations. The equivalent publication of the World Association of Girl Guides and Girl Scouts is Trefoil 'Round the World.

History

Colonel J. S. Wilson had been the Director of Training of The Boy Scouts Association, in that capacity he had worked with Scout associations from mnay different countries.

Upon the 50th anniversary of World Scouting in 1957, Wilson took his research notes gathered on a six-year world tour reviewing the world's Scout organizations, culminating in a five-month tour of Asia in October 1952, and authored the publication of the first edition of Scouting Round the World.

References

External links

Children's non-fiction books
Scouting
1957 children's books
1957 non-fiction books